Agricultural College and Research Institute, located in Kudumiyanmalai, Pudukkottai district, is a constituent college of Tamil Nadu Agricultural University Coimbatore that has operated since August 25, 2014. It is located near the Sikharagiriswara Temple, about 2 km from the college.

See also
Education in India
Literacy in India
List of institutions of higher education in Tamil Nadu

References

External links 
 website

Agricultural universities and colleges in Tamil Nadu
Education in Pudukkottai district
Educational institutions established in 2014
2014 establishments in Tamil Nadu